George N. Johnson (born 12 June 1938 in Monrovia) is a Liberian athlete. He competed for Liberia at the 1956 and 1960 Summer Olympics. He competed in the 400 metres, 800 metres and the 4×100 metres relay.

References

1938 births
Living people
Sportspeople from Monrovia
Liberian male sprinters
Liberian male middle-distance runners
Olympic athletes of Liberia
Athletes (track and field) at the 1956 Summer Olympics
Athletes (track and field) at the 1960 Summer Olympics